Gaya Junction railway station is a junction station serving the city of Gaya, the headquarters of Gaya district and Magadh Division in the Indian state of Bihar. Gaya is in the Mughalsarai railway division of the East Central Railway zone. Grand Chord rail-line that connects Howrah and New Delhi passes through Gaya. The city of Gaya is linked with other cities in Bihar through the rail network. Very few trains do-not stop here- sealdah duranto, bhubaneswar duranto, jharkhand sampark kranti and Odisha sampark kranti. The city has two major railway stations: Gaya Junction & Manpur Junction. Gaya is well connected with Patna, Jehanabad, Biharsharif, Rajgir, Islampur, Nawada through daily passenger and express train services.

History 
Several years before the Grand Chord was built, a connection from the Howrah–Delhi main line to Gaya was developed in 1900 and the South Bihar Railway Company (operated by EIR) had laid a line from Lakhisarai to Gaya in 1879. The Grand Chord was opened on 6 December 1906.

New developments
In February 2012, the Indian Railways had planned to set up a Railway Station Development Corporation (RSDC) that will work on improving the major railway stations including Gaya Junction by building and developing Restaurants, shopping areas and food plaza for commercial business and improving passenger amenities.

Facilities 
There are 9 platforms in the Gaya Junction and the platform 10 is under construction. There are 1 Pilgrim Platform also, where the pilgrim train stop. The platforms are interconnected with foot overbridges (FOB). It has three foot overbridge, the station houses all the major facilities like waiting rooms, computerized reservation facility, food plaza, dormitory, retiring rooms, cafeteria, bookshop, etc. Existing facilities are being revamped for developing it as model station.

Trains 
Gaya Junction's location on the Delhi–Kolkata Grand chord route, makes it served by numerous express and superfast trains from all over the country. Gaya Junction is the second most important railway station in Bihar after Patna and second largest in terms of platforms after Patna Jn. It is a junction and is connected to all the major cities such as New Delhi, Kolkata, Mumbai and Chennai through important broad-gauge routes (direct trains). Now it is also directly connected to Guwahati (N-E India). There is a direct train, Mahabodhi Express from New Delhi to Gaya daily. Another air-conditioned train Garib Rath has been added from Gaya to Anand bihar Jn (Delhi),which runs weekly.
There are direct trains from Gaya to important stations in India like Delhi, Kolkata, Chennai, Kamakhya–Guwahati, Ranchi, Parasnath(Shikharji), Bokaro, Varanasi, Lucknow, Kota, Kanpur, Allahabad, Agra, Bareilly, Mathura, Jabalpur, Bhopal, Indore, Nagpur, Mumbai, Pune, Puri, Ahmedabad, Jodhpur, Amritsar, Dehradun, Kalka, Jammu, Gwalior, Dehradun, Jamshedpur (Tatanagar), Bhuvaneshwar, etc. Several electrified local passenger trains also run from Gaya to neighbouring destinations at regular intervals. Gaya Patna daily bond passenger train also plays a very essential role in city. The train starts from Gaya Junction to Patna Junction via Bela, Chakand, Jehananbad, Makhdoompur.

References

External links 

  Trains at Gaya
 Gaya Railway Station Map
 Official website of the Gaya district

Railway stations in Gaya district
Mughalsarai railway division
Transport in Gaya, India
Railway junction stations in Bihar
Railway stations in India opened in 1879
Indian Railway A1 Category Stations